Cannabis in Virginia is legal for medical use and recreational use. The first medical marijuana dispensary opened in August 2020, and adult recreational use became legalized in July 2021.

In April 2020, Virginia Governor Ralph Northam approved a bill to decriminalize simple marijuana possession, which took effect July 2020. In February 2021, both houses of Virginia's General Assembly passed legislation to fully legalize cannabis, with an effective date of 2024. Virginia is the first state in the southern United States to legalize cannabis.

Legislation and history
In the 1990s, the Virginia General Assembly tightened the laws on cannabis, but added a provision allowing its use and distribution for cancer and glaucoma. There is currently a provision in the law, § 18.2-251, which allows a case to be dismissed if the offender goes through probation and treatment. In the 1990s, Virginia also had some of the lightest penalties for cultivation in the United States; cultivation of any amount for personal use counted as simple possession (otherwise it carried felony penalties of up to 35 years imprisonment). 

Before July 2020 in the Commonwealth of Virginia, possession of cannabis as a first offense was an unclassified misdemeanor, with a maximum penalty of 30 days in jail and/or $500 fine (or both), and loss of driving privileges. However, with a change in the law as of July 1, 2017, the loss of driving privileges was then optional for adults (depending upon the judge's discretion) while still mandatory for juveniles. A subsequent offense was previously a Class 1 misdemeanor, with a maximum penalty of 12 months in confinement and a $2,500 fine (or both), plus loss of driving privileges. A first offense under this system qualified for a deferred disposition resulting in dismissal. This option required a drug assessment, classes, community service, and either loss of driving privileges for six months or a larger amount (50 hours) of community service. The first-offender program was controversial, because it could affect immigration status and did not allow the defendant to qualify for expungement, and as a result, remained on the individual's record for life.

One year later, personal use became legal.

Medical cannabis in Virginia
In 1979, Virginia passed legislation allowing doctors to recommend cannabis for glaucoma or the side effects of chemotherapy. In 1997, repeal of the medical cannabis law seemed certain, but did not actually happen. For many years, though, the medical cannabis law was non-functioning because prescriptions were disallowed by federal law, given cannabis's status under the Controlled Substances Act as a Schedule I controlled substance with no accepted medical use. In 1998, the Virginia General Assembly tightened the laws on medical cannabis use and added a provision allowing its use and distribution for cancer and glaucoma. 

In March 2015, Governor Terry McAuliffe signed House Bill 1445 and Senate Bill 1235, creating affirmative defense against a possession charge that cannabidiol oil (also known as CBD oil) and THC-A oil for patients who have a doctor's recommendation for those substances for treatment of epilepsy. The bill had passed Virginia's Senate with a vote of 37–1 in February.  

In September 2018, the Virginia State Board of Pharmacy approved the applications for five companies to open medical cannabis dispensaries across the Commonwealth. As of April 2019 only 251 of the 35,404 doctors licensed to practice in Virginia had registered with the state to write medical cannabis recommendations. Also legislation passed in 2019 allowing doses to contain up to 10 mg of THC to patients.  The first medical marijuana dispensary in Virginia would not open until August 2020 with three others slated to open before the end of the year.

2015 failed attempt to decriminalize
In 2015, the Virginia Senate's Courts of Justice committee rejected bills to decriminalize cannabis and remove the smoke a joint, lose your license provision in the Virginia Code.

2020 reform measures on decriminalization
Following the 2019 Virginia elections, in which Democrats won control of both houses of the General Assembly, Virginia Attorney General Mark Herring called for cannabis to be eventually legalized; he scheduled a Cannabis Summit for December 2019 to address the issues of decriminalization of marijuana, social equity, regulating CBD and hemp products, and pathways towards legalization through legislative efforts.

In February 2020, the House of Delegates voted 64–34 in favor of Delegate Charniele Herring's HB972 to decriminalize personal possession of marijuana. The next day the Senate voted 27–13 in favor of Senator Adam Ebbin's SB 2 with a similar decriminalization scope. Virginia was to become the 27th state to remove the threat of jail time for low-level marijuana possession. On March 8, 2020, the Virginia House of Delegates and Senate passed legislation on a marijuana decriminalization plan. In April 2020, this bill to decriminalize simple marijuana possession was approved by Virginia Governor Ralph Northam, and the bill  took effect on July 1, 2020.

As part of HB 972, which was signed by Governor Ralph Northam on May 21, 2020, four members of the Governor’s Cabinet (the Secretaries of Agriculture and Forestry, Finance, Health and Human Resources, and Public Safety and Homeland Security) were chosen to lead a group of government officials, policy experts, healthcare professionals, and community leaders that would examine the effects of legalizing the sale and personal use of marijuana in Virginia. The group was told to submit a report by November 30, 2020. 

A report by JLARC or the Joint Legislative Audit & Review Commission found that the retail sales from a legal marijuana market would produce substantially more revenue than the associated state costs. The report found that the state of Virginia would spend approximately $10-$16 million annually on a state regulatory agency, public health programs, and social equity programs. Additionally, the retail sales of marijuana would likely begin in as little as two years. Before this time the state could raise several millions of dollars in licensing fees that would likely offset the majority of the cost. After the retail sales of marijuana began, the sales tax from the sales would likely offset the remaining cost of legalization. If the sales tax was set to 25 percent, the estimated net tax revenue would be between $177-$300 million after operatorial costs. 

On November 16, 2020, Governor Northam announced that he would introduce and support legislation to legalize marijuana in the Commonwealth of Virginia. Governor Northam stated that the proposed legislation would need to addresses five different areas of concern, those include: social equity, racial equity, and economic equity, public health, protections for young people, upholding the Virginia Indoor Clean Air Act, and data collection. 

Other bills in the General Assembly addressing legalization of simple possession, including Lee J. Carter's HB 87 and Steve Heretick's HB 269, have been deferred to the 2021 session.

2021 legalization of recreational use
On January 22, Virginia SB 1406, "Marijuana; legalization of simple possession, penalties", sponsored by senators Adam Ebbin and Louise Lucas, was advanced by the state Senate Rehabilitation and Social Services Committee. 

On February 3, SB 1406 and corresponding HB 2312 each were passed by the final committee prior to a floor vote in the Senate and House. Both bills passed on February 5, legalizing the use and personal cultivation of cannabis by adults ages 21 and older, as well as establish a regulatory framework for commercial cannabis production, manufacturing, testing, and retail sales by 2024.

Governor Northam said he would sign the bills into law if they reached his desk. Substitute Senate Bill 1406 was passed by the House General Laws Committee on February 11. On February 16, the House passed a substitute Senate bill 55-42 and the Senate passed its bill 23-15, requiring a conference committee to resolve the differences. The vote was said by regional media to ensure that cannabis can be legally purchased in Virginia in 2024, but a conference committee needed to reconcile the Senate's date for legalization of possession (July 1, 2021) and the House's 2024 legalization date. The conference committee reached agreement on a bill on February 27 regarding legalization (including cultivation, retail sales and possession) on January 1, 2024, and the Assembly passed it the same day and sent it to Governor Northam for approval.
 
As originally proposed, Virginia would have become the second state (after Illinois) to simultaneously legalize marijuana possession and retail sales; other states have legalized possession before the beginning of state-licensed sales. Instead, advocates successfully pressured Northam to amend the legislation to legalize possession on July 1, 2021, arguing that delaying the date of legalization perpetuates injustice. 

On March 25, still not having signed the bill, Northam indicated that he was in favor of such a change to the implementation date; he subsequently sent back an amended version of the bill to the Virginia assembly on March 31. On April 7, the legislature took up the governor's recommended amendments in a one-day reconvened session. Both houses of the legislature (including Lt. Gov. Justin Fairfax's tiebreaking vote in the Senate) approved the governor's entire recommendation verbatim; as a result, under Article V, Section 6, subsections (b)(iii) and (c)(iii) of the Constitution of Virginia, the bill became law on July 1, 2021. The law legalized adult recreational use where adults ages 21 and over can possess  or less of marijuana and also allows for the growth of up to four cannabis plants per household. Retail sales and the opening of recreational cannabis dispensaries was scheduled to begin on January 1, 2024, but a re-enactment clause requiring the Virginia legislature to re-approve the sales provision was not taken up following the Republican takeover of the General Assembly in 2021.

See also 
 Taylor v. United States (2016)
Cannabis in Washington, D.C.
Cannabis in Maryland

References

External links
 Impact on the Commonwealth of Legalizing the Sale and Personal Use of Marijuana (November 30, 2020) report to Virginia General Assembly and Governor of Virginia

Virginia
Crime in Virginia
Virginia culture